Hertz Investment Group is a real estate investment company. The company was founded by Judah Hertz in 1977.

In 2003, the company acquired a 26-story office tower and retail complex from Simon Property Group for $36 million. The property was sold in 2009.

The company sold The Hyatt at Capitol Square in Columbus, Ohio for $19.5 million in 2011. In 2012, the company defaulted on a loan secured by an office building in Kansas City. The company acquired Bridgewater Place, an office building in Grand Rapids, Michigan in 2013.

In 2014, the company offered the Gateway Center in Pittsburgh for sale. In 2015, the company acquired 6 office buildings in the Southeast United States for $417.4 million.

In 2016, the company acquired 4 office towers in Indianapolis, Milwaukee, and Cleveland totaling more than 3 million square feet from Sam Zell's Equity Commonwealth for $416.9 million.

During the COVID-19 pandemic, the company's investment in office space became a liability, as remote work became increasingly prevalent. On August 27, 2020, Judah Hertz stepped down as chairman and CEO. His son Zev Hertz took over five days later. In 2021, the company began investing in residential real estate and apartment buildings.

In 2020, an office tower in Lake Charles, Louisiana was severely damaged in hurricanes Laura and Delta, leaving a 22-story tall tower owned by Hertz Investment Group covered in plywood boards. As the highest building in the city, the residents of Lake Charles were forced to look at the eyesore. The company is currently in litigation with the insurance company to repair the damage.  Almost two years after Hurricane Laura, the City of Lake Charles declared the office tower to be a blighted property in an attempt to force Hertz Investment Group to begin repairs to the building, and then joined the lawsuit between Hertz Investment Group and their insurance provider to protect the City of Lake Charles if Hertz Investment Group took the insurance money and abandoned the dangerous and decaying building to the City to demolish at an estimated cost to tax payers of $20 million.

References

Real estate companies of the United States
1979 establishments in California
Companies established in 1979
Real estate companies established in 1979
Companies based in Santa Monica, California
Privately held companies based in California